USS Nemes (SP-424) was a United States Navy patrol vessel commissioned in July 1917 and sunk in August 1917.

Nemes was built as a private motorboat of the same name in 1909 by Van Deise at Camden, New Jersey. On 10 July 1917, the U.S. Navy acquired her from her owner, J. C. Noblit of Germantown, Pennsylvania, for use as a section patrol boat during World War I. She was commissioned soon afterwards as USS Nemes (SP-424).

Assigned to the 7th Naval District headquartered at Key West, Florida, Nemes moved south to Key West to begin patrol duties there. In August 1917, scheduled to patrol around Key West, she pulled into nearby Cotteral Bay for cleaning. While she was there, an explosion rocked her on 21 August 1917, causing her to burn and sink. There were no deaths, but six men were burned.

References

Department of the Navy Naval History and Heritage Command Online Library of Selected Images: Civilian Ships: Nemes (Motor Boat, 1909). Served as USS Nemes (SP-424) in 1917
NavSource Online: Section Patrol Craft Photo Archive: Nemes (SP 424)

Patrol vessels of the United States Navy
World War I patrol vessels of the United States
Ships built in Camden, New Jersey
1909 ships
Shipwrecks of the Florida Keys
Maritime incidents in 1917
Ship fires